Fulmodeston or Fulmodeston-cum-Croxton is a village and civil parish in the English county of Norfolk. Fulmodeston parish also includes the small villages of Barney.

History
Fulmodeston's name is of mixed Anglo-Saxon and Viking origin and derives from the Old English and Old Norse for either Fulcmod's and Krok's settlement or village.

In the Domesday Book, Fulmodeston is listed as a settlement of 29 households in the hundred of Gallow. In 1086, the village was part of the East Anglian estates of William de Warenne.

During the Second World War, Fulmodeston was the site of a Starfish site, complete with dummy Bristol Blenheims and flare paths, to draw Luftwaffe attention away from RAF West Raynham.

Geography
According to the 2011 Census, Fulmodeston has a population of 442 residents living in 219 households.

Fulmodeston falls within the constituency of Broadland and is represented at Parliament by Jerome Mayhew MP of the Conservative Party. For the purposes of local government, the parish falls within the district of Broadland.

St. Mary's Church
Fulmodeston's parish holds the ruins of St. Mary's Church and dates from the mid-Fifteenth Century. The church was abandoned in 1880s in favour of Christ Church.

Christ Church
Christ Church Fulmodeston was built in the late-Nineteenth Century to replace the decaying churches of St. Mary's, Fulmodeston and St. John the Baptist, Croxton and was based on the designs of William Bassett-Smith.

Transport
The nearest railway station is at Sheringham for the Bittern Line which runs between Sheringham, Cromer and Norwich. The nearest airport is Norwich International Airport.

War Memorial
Fulmodeston's war memorial takes the form of a wooden plaque listing the deceased, injured and survivors from the parish. The memorial lists the following names for the First World War:
 L-Cpl. Sidney H. Howe (1897-1916), 7th Bn., Royal Norfolk Regiment
 Pvt. Charles Nobes (1880-1918), 9th Bn., Durham Light Infantry
 Pvt. George E. Barnes (1899-1917), 1st Bn., East Surrey Regiment
 Pvt. James W. Moy (1897-1916), 19th (St. Pancras) Bn., London Regiment
 Pvt. Roger E. Barnes (1895-1917), 1st Bn., Royal Norfolk Regt.
 Pvt. Herbert J. Utting (1898-1915), 3rd Bn., Royal Norfolk Regt.
 Pvt. Bertie Todd (1888-1916), 3/5th Bn., Royal Norfolk Regt.
 Pvt. Sydney G. Nobes (d.1915), 8th Bn., Royal Norfolk Regt.
 Cyril E. Scott

References

Villages in Norfolk
North Norfolk
Civil parishes in Norfolk